The Saskatoon Riot were a professional baseball team that played at Cairns Field in the North Central League in 1994, in their first season their record was 32-38 under manager Ron Malcolm. The following season the team moved to the Prairie League and finished third in the Canadian division with a 26-45 record with attendance for the season at 38,711 with new manager George Scott. The next season the club would change its name to the Saskatoon Smokin' Guns.

References

Defunct baseball teams in Canada
Sports clubs disestablished in 1995
Defunct sports teams in Saskatchewan
Baseball teams in Saskatchewan
Defunct independent baseball league teams
Baseball teams established in 1994
1994 establishments in Saskatchewan
1995 disestablishments in Saskatchewan
Sport in Saskatoon